Henry Packenham DD (1787–1863)  was an Irish Anglican priest.

Packenham was educated at Gonville and Caius College, Cambridge. He was the incumbent at Ballyroan from  1813 to 1818, and of Ardbraccan from then until 1823. In that year he became Archdeacon of Emly. In 1843 he became Dean of St. Patrick's Cathedral, Dublin; and, from 1846, also Dean of Christ Church Cathedral, Dublin.

He died on 27 December 1863.

References

Alumni of Gonville and Caius College, Cambridge
Archdeacons of Emly
Deans of St. Patrick's Cathedral, Dublin
Deans of Christ Church Cathedral, Dublin
1787 births
1863 deaths